Batu Kawah is a state constituency in Sarawak, Malaysia, that has been represented in the Sarawak State Legislative Assembly since 1969.

The state constituency was created in the 1968 redistribution and is mandated to return a single member to the Sarawak State Legislative Assembly under the first past the post voting system.

History
2006–2016: The constituency contains the polling districts of Kawah, Stapok, Haji Baki, Kitang, Sin San Tu, Kim Chu Shin.

2016–present: The constituency contains the polling districts of RPR Batu Kawah, Batu Kawah Bazaar, RPR Jalan Arang, Moyan, Desa Wira, Kuching City Mall, Sinar Budi Baru, Sinar Budi Lama, Stapok, Maong, Sejijak, Bandar Baru Batu Kawah, Pine's Square Batu Kawah, Sin San Tu, Kim Chu Shin.

Representation history

Election results

 
{{MASelec/source || |hide=<ref name="star">

References

Sarawak state constituencies